Christian Esguerra is a Filipino political journalist and educator. He currently hosts Facts First, a political podcast streaming live three times a week, where he tackles current issues in politics and governance. A persistent critic of disinformation activities, Esguerra was the former anchor and managing editor of the political talk program After the Fact on ABS-CBN News Channel (ANC), launched in May 2020. He started his career in journalism as a reporter for the Philippine Daily Inquirer in 2000, and joined ABS-CBN in 2015 as a news correspondent and anchor.

Esguerra is also an assistant professor teaching political reporting and journalism ethics at the University of Santo Tomas (UST), where he is also a researcher at the Research Center for Culture, Arts, and Humanities. Outside of the UST Esguerra's research project titled "Captive Congress: Interest Group Capture in the Philippine House of Representatives" was funded by the DLSU Southeast Asian Research Program as part of the program's Democracy Discourse Series.

In 2019 Esguerra received the Award of Distinction from the Center for Media Freedom and Responsibility, as well as the Titus Brandsma Award for Emergent Leadership in Journalism. In 2020, he was awarded a Marshall McLuhan Fellowship.

Education 
Esguerra graduated cum laude with a Bachelor of Arts in Journalism at the University of Santo Tomas in 2000. He finished his masters degree in Theology, major in Social Pastoral Communication, at the same university in 2011.

Career 
Esguerra started his career in journalism as a reporter for the Philippine Daily Inquirer from 2000 to 2015. In 2006 he was a journalism fellow at Seoul National University. In 2008 he was a research fellow at the University of San Francisco. In 2015 he left the Inquirer to join ABS-CBN's roster as a news correspondent and news anchor. He would be the anchor and managing editor of ANC's Early Edition from 2018 to 2021, and the same for the hard-hitting political talk show After the Fact from 2020 to 2022. Currently Esguerra hosts the streaming political podcast Facts First. A vocal critic of disinformation and political pressure on journalists and mainstream journalism media, Esguerra is also a trustee of the Journalism Studies Association of the Philippines (JSAP).

On 30 March 2022 Esguerra announced via Twitter the termination of After the Fact, citing the "prevailing political climate" as the reason for ending the program. Commenters on Esguerra's tweet saw the show's termination as a capitulation by ABS-CBN's executives to pressure from the Rodrigo Duterte government. In 2020, ABS-CBN's franchise was not renewed by the Rodrigo Duterte government-leaning supermajority in the Philippine Congress, which forced the main terrestrial channel to go off-air. Election lawyer Emil Marañon lamented ABS-CBN's "dropping" of Esguerra, saying Esguerra is "one of the best journalists in the country who dare ask the hard questions," writing further that "his brand of journalism is what gives ABS-CBN the credibility it enjoys." Marañon further noted that this was a "bad call."

Awards 

 Gawad Dr Pio Valenzuela for Excellence in Journalism, City of Valenzuela, 2019
 Titus Brandsma Award for Emergent Leadership in Journalism, 2019
 Award of Distinction – Center for Media Freedom and Responsibility (CMFR), 2019
 Marshall McLuhan Fellowship, 2020

Selected publications 

 Esguerra, C.V. (2020). "How strongmen influence digital narratives in the age of COVID-19: The case of Rodrigo Duterte," In Challenges of Communication in the Digital Age. College of Social Culture and Media, Torun. (Book chapter)
 Esguerra, C.V. (2019). "The role of the Catholic Church in Philippine independence and democracy." In Catholics and Independence: Opportunities and Threats. College of Social Culture and Media, Torun. (Book chapter)
 Bernardo, P. X. J. C., Lechuga, T. S., & Esguerra, C. V. (2019). “Ethical dilemmas of Filipino reporters during the 2016 Philippine presidential campaign trail: A phenomenology.” Journal of Media and Communication Research 11(3), 23–40.

Personal life 
Esguerra married Naomi Bernardo, a doctor, on July 24, 2021.

References

External links 

 Facts First Live on YouTube
 Facts First Podcast on Spotify
 Facts First Podcast on Apple
 Christian Esguerra on YouTube
 Christian Esguerra Archives | Philippine Daily Inquirer News
 Christian Esguerra Archives | VERA Files
 Christian Esguerra Archives | CMFR

Living people
Filipino podcasters
ABS-CBN News and Current Affairs people
Filipino television news anchors
University of Santo Tomas alumni
Year of birth missing (living people)